Andrew Richmond (born 20 January 1882; date of death unknown) was a Scottish footballer who made over 160 appearances as a left back in the Scottish League for Queen's Park. He also played for Rangers and was capped by Scotland at full international and junior level.

Personal life 
Richmond served as a corporal in the Royal Field Artillery during the First World War.

Career statistics

Honours 
Rangers

 Scottish League First Division (2): 1910–11, 1911–12
 Glasgow Cup (2): 1910–11, 1911–12
 Glasgow Merchants Charity Cup (1): 1910–11

References

External links

London Hearts profile (Scotland)
London Hearts profile (Scottish League)

Year of death missing
Association football fullbacks
Scottish footballers
Scotland international footballers
Queen's Park F.C. players
Rangers F.C. players
Scottish Football League players
Scottish Football League representative players
1882 births
People from Dennistoun
Footballers from Glasgow
Scottish Junior Football Association players
Scotland junior international footballers
Parkhead F.C. players

British Army personnel of World War I
Royal Field Artillery soldiers